Al-Jawf Regional Airport is an airport serving Sakakah (also known as Al-Jawf or Al-Jouf), a city in Al Jawf Province, Saudi Arabia. The nearest airport is Gurayat Domestic Airport.

Facilities

Airlines and destinations

Airlines offering scheduled passenger service:

See also 

 Saudia
 King Khaled International Airport
 List of airports in Saudi Arabia

References

External links

 
 
 

Airports in Saudi Arabia
Al-Jawf Province